Mount Hopeless is a mountain in Victoria, Australia. It is in a range on the eastern side of the Tambo River near Mount Bindi, Mount Tongio, and Mount Elizabeth.

See also

List of mountains in Victoria

Hopeless